The Louisiana State League was a minor league baseball league, with league franchises based in Louisiana. The league had two incarnations, each lasting for one year. The league fielded teams in both 1915 and 1920.

History
The teams and standings of the 1915 league are unknown.

The 1920 league was a six–team Class D level minor league based in Louisiana, United States.

The League began play on April 20, 1920 and permanently folded on July 14, 1920. The Oakdale Lumberjacks were in 1st place with a 37–24 overall record when the league folded. Oakdale had won the first–half title and the Abbeville Sluggers had the best second–half record when the league folded. The New Iberia and Rayne franchised had simultaneously folded on July 6, 1920. Oakdale had a record of 37–24, playing under manager Louis Bremerhof, when the Louisiana State League League folded. The Lumberjackes finished 1.0 game ahead 2nd place New Iberia Sugar Boys (36–25). They were followed by the Lafayette Hubs (36–31), Abbeville Sluggers (33–35), Rayne Rice Birds (30–33) and Alexandria Tigers (23–47) in the final 1920 Louisiana State League standings.

Cities represented
Abbeville, LA: Abbeville Sluggers (1920)
Alexandria, LA: Alexandria Tigers (1920)
Lafayette, LA: Lafayette Hubs (1920)
New Iberia, LA: New Iberia Sugar Boys (1920)
Oakdale, LA: Oakdale Lumberjacks (1920)
Rayne, LA: Rayne Rice Birds (1920)

Standings and statistics 
1920 Louisiana State League - schedule
Oakdale lost seven wins due to ineligible players.Rayne and New Iberia disbanded July 6.The league disbanded July 15.

References

External links
Louisiana State League

 
Defunct minor baseball leagues in the United States
Baseball leagues in Louisiana
Sports leagues established in 1915
1915 establishments in Louisiana
Sports leagues disestablished in 1915
Sports leagues established in 1920
Sports leagues disestablished in 1920